Rahimo Football Club is a Burkinabé football team based in Bobo-Dioulasso, Burkina Faso, which competes in the Burkinabé Premier League.

History
Rahimo Football Club was founded in 2012 in Bobo-Dioulasso by retired former Les Étalons player Rahim Ouédraogo.

Rahimo were crowned Burkinabé Premier League for the first time on 19 May 2019. On 22 July 2019, Rahimo were drawn against Nigerian champions Enyimba in the 2019–20 CAF Champions League Preliminary round.

Continental history

Stadium
Rahimo play their home games at the 10,000-capacity Stade Wobi.

Honours

Domestic 
 Burkinabé Premier League (1): 2018–19
 Burkinabé SuperCup (1): 2020

Notable former players
 Lassina Traoré

References

Football clubs in Burkina Faso